Johana Riva Garabetian (born November 23, 1993) is a Uruguayan model and beauty pageant titleholder who was crowned Miss Uruguay 2014 and represented her country at the Miss Universe 2014 pageant.

Early life 
Johana was born on November 23, 1993, in Montevideo, Uruguay. She is of Armenian descent and speaks Spanish, Armenian, and English. At 16, she first competed in a national beauty contest in the city of Paysandú, and from there decided to participate in more competitions. She had a modeling career already established at 19, when she decided to move to Lima, Peru. Johana worked towards her goal of modeling for catalogues, commercials and fashion shows for renowned designers and brands. In mid-2013, Johana decided to return to Uruguay and competed for Miss Universo Uruguay in 2014, which she was the winner of and was crowned Miss Uruguay. Currently she is working hard to prepare for the upcoming Miss Universe pageant.

Pageantry

Miss Tourism International 2008 
Johana was crowned as Miss Tourism Uruguay 2008 and competed at the Miss Tourism International 2008 in Malaysia. She placed as Top 15.

Miss Atlantico International 
Johana competed at the Miss Atlantico International 2010 in Uruguay. She awarded as Miss Photogenic.

Miss Uruguay 2014 
Johana was crowned as the new Miss Uruguay 2014. She is officially wearing sashes Miss Universo Uruguay 2014 and being Uruguay's women ambassador in her country. The Miss Uruguay 2014 pageant was held at the conclusion of the event held at the Punta Del Este Arenas Hotel & Resort in Chihuahua on January 19, 2014.

Miss Universe 2014 
Johana represented Uruguay at Miss Universe 2014 but Unplaced.

References

External links 

Official Miss Uruguay website

1993 births
Living people
Miss Universe 2014 contestants
Uruguayan beauty pageant winners
Uruguayan people of Armenian descent
Uruguayan female models
People from Montevideo
Uruguayan emigrants to Peru